Marsham is a village and civil parish in the English county of Norfolk, about  north of Norwich.

For local government purposes, it falls within the district of Broadland.  Marsham has its own Parish Council, Marsham Parish Council.

History
The Imperial Gazetteer of England and Wales (1870–1872) described Marsham thus:

Gallery

References

Villages in Norfolk
Civil parishes in Norfolk
Broadland